Univair Aircraft Corporation is an American aircraft manufacturer holding the type certificate for the Stinson 108 series, and Ercoupe series aircraft, including the Forney, Alon and the Mooney M10 Cadet. The company holds parts manufacturing approvals for Aeronca Champion, Bellanca Citabria, Bellanca Decathlon, Aeronca Scout, Cessna, Luscombe, Piper and Taylorcraft.

Univair was founded in the Denver, Colorado area in February 1946 by J.E. “Eddie” Dyer and Don Vest as Vest Aircraft Company. The company initially performed flight instruction, parts and repair. In 1963, Vest was closed following the death of its founder, and was reestablished by his wife in 1966 as Univair.

Univair has specialized in manufacturing FAA approved new parts for vintage aircraft such as the Piper Cub.

Aircraft

References

External links

Aircraft manufacturers of the United States
Manufacturing companies established in 1946
Companies based in Aurora, Colorado
1946 establishments in Colorado